Indigenous peoples of the Subarctic are the aboriginal peoples who live in the Subarctic regions of the Americas, Asia and Europe, located south of the true Arctic. This region includes the interior of Alaska, the Western Subarctic or western Canadian Shield and Mackenzie River drainage area, the Eastern Subarctic or Eastern Canadian Shield, Scandinavia, Western Russia and East Asia. Peoples of subarctic Siberia and Greenland are included in the subarctic; however, Greenlandic Inuit are usually classified as Indigenous peoples of the Arctic.

Languages
Native subarctic peoples have over 38 languages into five major language families: Algonquian, Athapaskan, Indo-European, Turkic and Uralic.

Arts and cultures
The reindeer Tangifer tarandus (caribou in North America) and deer have traditionally played a central role in North American and Asian Subarctic culture, providing food, clothing, shelter, and tools. In North America, items such as the babiche bag are made of caribou and deer rawhide. Moosehair embroidery and porcupine quill embroidery are also worked onto hides and birchbark. After introduction by Europeans and Asians, glass beads became popular and are sewn into floral designs. Additionally, some cultures practiced agriculture, alongside hunting and gathering.

In the Sami (Lapp) culture of Scandinavia, reindeer husbandry has traditionally played an important role. Traditionally the Sami lived and worked in reindeer herding groups  called siiddat, which consisted of several families and their herds. Members of the siidda helped each other with the management and husbandry of the herds.

In Russia, many different indigenous peoples engage in reindeer herding, from European Russia right across to Siberia. One of the largest groups are the Nenets people, who practice nomadic herding, migrating long distances each year (up to 1,000 km annually) between their summer and winter pastures. At present about 13,500 Nenets are engaged with reindeer herding.

List of peoples 

Na-Dene
Athabaskan–Eyak
Athabaskan 
Northern Athabaskan 
Ahtna 
Sahtu
Central Cordillera 
Kaska 
Tagish
Tahltan
Chipewyan
Dakelh
Deg Hitʼan 
Denaʼina 
Babine
Wet'suwet'en
Dunneza 
Gwich'in
Hän
Hare
Holikachuk
Koyukon
Sekani
Slavey
Tanana
Tlicho
Tsilhqot'in
Northern Tutchone
Southern Tutchone
Upper Kuskokwim
Yellowknives
Tlingit, United States (Alaska) and Canada (British Columbia and Yukon)
Algic 
Algonquian
Central Algonquian 
Ojibwe
Anishinaabe 
Oji-Cree 
Anishinini
Severn Ojibwa 
Ojibwa 
Odawa 
Cree
Atikamekw
Innu
Naskapi
Maritime Algonquian
Mi'kmaq, Newfoundland
Qalipu First Nation, Newfoundland
Turkic
Kipchak
Kipchak–Bulgar 
Bashkir, Russia (Bashkortostan)
Tatars
Volga Tatars, Russia (Tatarstan)
Oghur 
Chuvash, Russia (Chuvashia)
Siberian Turkic
Northern Turkic
Yakuts, Russia (Sakha Republic)
Uralic
Baltic Finn
Izhorians, Russia
Karelian, Finland (South Karelia and North Karelia) and  Russia (Republic of Karelia and Leningrad Oblast)
Veps, Russia
Votes, Russia
Permian
Komi, Russia (Komi Republic and Perm Krai)
Udmurt, Russia (Udmurtia)
Sámi
Ugrians
Khanty, Russia (Khanty-Mansi Autonomous Okrug)
Mansi, Russia (Khanty-Mansi Autonomous Okrug)
Volga Finn
Inuit
Nunatsiavut, Canada (Labrador)
NunatuKavut, Canada (Labrador)

See also

Aboriginal peoples in Canada
Alaska Natives
Caribou
Circumpolar peoples
Hudson's Bay Company
Subarctic climate
Alaska Native Storytelling
Sápmi

Notes

 
Indigenous peoples of North America
Indigenous peoples of Europe
Indigenous peoples of Asia